Gunnar Örn Jónsson (born 30 April 1985) is an Icelandic football player, currently playing for Icelandic football club Augnablik Kópavogur.

Club career
Born in Reykjavík, Jónsson began his career with Úrvalsdeild side Breiðablik, based in Kópavogur in 2002. After good performances with Breiðablik in the 2007 season he was signed by the giants of Icelandic football KR before the 2008 season.

In the 2009 Úrvalsdeild season Jónsson scored 8 goals in 20 league games for KR and was selected by fellow players as member of the "2009 team of the season". In March 2010 Jónsson played his first game for Iceland against Mexico, coming on as substitute in 0–0 draw. After impressive pre-season in 2010 where KR won the official pre-season tournament, Jónsson and his teammates were unable to meet the high expectations and finished only 4th in the 2010 Úrvalsdeild.

On 16 April 2015, Jónsson joined Augnablik Kópavogur.

References

External links

1985 births
Living people
Gunnar Orn Jonsson
Gunnar Orn Jonsson
Association football wingers
Gunnar Orn Jonsson
Gunnar Orn Jonsson
Gunnar Orn Jonsson
Gunnar Orn Jonsson